The Las Vegas Open  is a darts tournament organised by the American Darts Organization that started in 1978.

List of winners

Men's

Women's

Tournament records

 Most wins ?: .  .
 Most Finals ?:  . 
 Most Semi Finals ?
 Most Quarter Finals ?:
 Most Appearances ?: . 
 Most Prize Money won $?: .
 Youngest Winner age ?: .
 Oldest Winner age ?''': .

See also
List of BDO ranked tournaments
List of WDF tournaments

References

External links
Official American Darts Organization website

1978 establishments in Nevada
Darts tournaments
Sports competitions in Las Vegas